Physalaemus soaresi is a species of frog in the family Leptodactylidae. It is endemic to southeastern Brazil where it is only known from three localities in the Rio de Janeiro state, one of them lost to urbanization and habitat degradation.

Both locations suffer from habitat loss, and the latter also from fire.

The species lays its eggs in a foam nest on the surface of temporary pools.

References

soaresi
Endemic fauna of Brazil
Amphibians of Brazil
Taxa named by Eugênio Izecksohn
Amphibians described in 1965
Taxonomy articles created by Polbot